Darrin Fitzgerald is an American former basketball player who is known for his collegiate career at Butler University. Between 1983–84 and 1986–87, Fitzgerald scored 2,019 points, which is the third highest total in school history. He is 5'9" and played the point guard and shooting guard positions.

He is also known as a prolific three-point shooter. In his senior year, the National Collegiate Athletic Association (NCAA) officially introduced three-pointers into college basketball. Fitzgerald took full advantage as he made an NCAA-record 158 threes in a single season (since broken by Stephen Curry in 2007–08), while his 5.64 made threes per game is a still-standing record (the next closest per-game average is a distant 4.96). Also in his senior year, Fitzgerald scored 54 points against Detroit, which is another school record. In all four seasons Fitzgerald led Butler in assists.

See also
List of NCAA Division I men's basketball season 3-point field goal leaders
List of NCAA Division I men's basketball players with 12 or more 3-point field goals in a game

References

1960s births
Living people
American men's basketball players
Basketball players from Indianapolis
Butler Bulldogs men's basketball players
Point guards
Shooting guards